Kepahiang is a town, district, and regency seat of Kepahiang Regency in Bengkulu, Indonesia. 

With population of around 51,400 in 2021 and population density of around 806 people per square kilometer, it is the most populous and most densely populated district in the regency. It is the administrative and economic center of Kepahiang Regency. It borders Ujan Mas District in the north, Kabawetan and Tebat Karai District in the east, Seberang Musi District in the south, and Central Bengkulu Regency in the west.

References 

Districts of Kepahiang Regency
Regency seats of Bengkulu